Johann Michael Haydn (14 September 173710 August 1806) was an Austrian composer of the Classical period, the younger brother of Joseph Haydn.

Life
Michael Haydn was born in 1737 in the Austrian village of Rohrau, near the Hungarian border. His father was Mathias Haydn, a wheelwright who also served as "Marktrichter", an office akin to village mayor. Haydn's mother Maria,  Koller, had previously worked as a cook in the palace of Count Harrach, the presiding aristocrat of Rohrau. Mathias was an enthusiastic folk musician, who during the journeyman period of his career had taught himself to play the harp, and he also made sure that his children learned to sing.

Michael went to Vienna at the age of eight, his early professional career path being paved by his older brother Joseph, whose skillful singing had landed him a position as a boy soprano in the St. Stephen's Cathedral, Vienna choir under the direction of Georg Reutter, as were Johann Georg Albrechtsberger and Franz Joseph Aumann, both composers with whom Haydn later traded manuscripts. By Michael's 12th birthday he was earning extra money as a substitute organist at the cathedral and had, reportedly, performed preludes and fantasies of his own composition. The early 19th-century author Albert Christoph Dies, based on Joseph's late-life reminiscences, wrote:
Reutter was so captivated by [Joseph]'s talents that he declared to his father that even if he had twelve sons he would take care of them all. The father saw himself freed of a great burden by this offer, consented to it, and some five years after dedicated Joseph's brothers Michael, and still later Johann to the musical muse. Both were taken on as choirboys, and, to Joseph's unending joy, both brothers were turned over to him to be trained.

The same source indicates that Michael was a brighter student than Joseph, and that (particularly when Joseph had grown enough to have trouble keeping his soprano voice) it was Michael's singing that was the more admired.

About 1753, he left the choir school because of the breaking of his voice. In 1760 Michael was appointed Kapellmeister at Großwardein (today Oradea) and later, in 1762, was appointed concertmaster at Salzburg, where he remained for 44 years, during which he wrote over 360 compositions comprising both church and instrumental music. From their mutual sojourn in Salzburg, Haydn was acquainted with Mozart, who held his work in high esteem.

On 17 August 1768 he married singer Maria Magdalena Lipp (1745–1827); their only child, a daughter (Aloisia Josepha, born 31 January 1770) died just short of her first birthday, on 27 January 1771.

Leopold Mozart criticized Haydn's heavy drinking.

In Salzburg Haydn taught young Carl Maria von Weber and Anton Diabelli.

Michael remained close to Joseph all of his life. Joseph regarded his brother's music highly, to the point of feeling Michael's religious works were superior to his own (possibly for their devotional intimacy, as opposed to Joseph's monumental and majestic, more secularized, symphonic style). In 1802, when Michael was "offered lucrative and honourable positions" by "both Esterházy and the Grand Duke of Tuscany," he wrote to Joseph in Vienna asking for advice on whether or not to accept any of them, but in the end chose to stay in Salzburg. Michael and Maria Magdalena Haydn named their daughter Aloisia Josepha not in honor of Michael's brother, but after Josepha Daubrawa von Daubrawaick, who substituted as godmother at the baptism for Countess de Firmian.

He died in Salzburg at the age of 68.

Works
Musicologist Karl Geiringer has claimed that Michael Haydn has not received the recognition he deserves from posterity, taking the view that his church music, his choruses for male voices, and many of his instrumental works are on a respectable level and ought to be revived.

Michael Haydn never compiled a thematic catalog of his works, nor did he ever supervise the making of one. The earliest catalog was compiled in 1808 by Nikolaus Lang for his 'Biographische Skizze' (Biographical Sketch). In 1907 Lothar Perger compiled a catalogue of his orchestral works, the Perger-Verzeichnis, for Denkmäler der Tonkunst in Österreich, which is somewhat more reliable than Lang's catalog and attaches P. (for Perger) numbers to many of Haydn's instrumental works. And in 1915 Anton Maria Klafsky undertook a similar work regarding Michael's sacred vocal music. In 1982, Charles H. Sherman, who has edited scores of many of his symphonies for Doblinger, published a chronological catalog of them which some recording companies have adopted. Later, in 1991, Sherman joined forces with T. Donley Thomas to publish a chronological catalog of Michael's complete works using a single continuous range of numbers after Ludwig Ritter von Köchel's pioneering catalog of all of Mozart's works and Otto Erich Deutsch's similar comprehensive compendium for all of Schubert's works. Further important amendments to the Sherman/Thomas catalogue have been made by Dwight Blazin.

The task of cataloging Michael's music is facilitated by the fact that he almost always entered the date of completion on his manuscripts. Guesswork was necessary only where autograph manuscripts did not survive.

Haydn's sacred choral works are generally regarded as his most important; his musical taste and skill showed themselves best in his church compositions and were already in his lifetime old-fashioned. Some of these works include the Requiem pro defuncto Archiepiscopo Sigismundo (Requiem for the death of Archbishop Siegmund) in C minor, which greatly influenced the Requiem by Mozart; Missa Hispanica (which he exchanged for a diploma at Stockholm); his magnificent last St. Francis Mass in D minor; the motet Lauda Sion which he wished to have sung at his funeral; and a set of graduals, forty-two of which are reprinted in Anton Diabelli's Ecclesiasticon. He wrote several settings of the mass ordinary in German by Franz Seraph von Kohlbrenner, named Deutsches Hochamt.

Haydn was also a prolific composer of secular music, including 41 symphonies and wind partitas, and multiple concertos and chamber music including a string quintet in C major once thought to have been by his brother Joseph. There was another case of posthumous mistaken identity involving Michael Haydn: for many years, the G major symphony now known to be Michael Haydn's Symphony No. 25 was thought to be Mozart's Symphony No. 37 and assigned as K. 444. The confusion arose because an autograph was discovered with the opening movement of the symphony in Mozart's hand and the rest in another's hand. It is now known that Mozart composed the slow introduction to the first movement but the rest of the work is by Michael.

Indeed, several of Michael Haydn's works influenced Mozart. To give just three examples: the Te Deum "which Wolfgang was later to follow very closely in K. 141"; the finale of the Symphony No. 23 which influenced the finale of the G major Quartet, K. 387; and the (fugal) transition and (non-fugal) closing theme of the G major second subject expositions of the finales of both Michael's Symphony No. 28 (1784) and Mozart's monumental last Symphony No. 41 (Jupiter) (1788), both in C major.

List of works

Instrumental music
 1.1 Symphonies (43 symphonies + single movements of symphonies)
 1.2 Concertos (12 concertos + 1 single movement)
 1.3 Serenades (21 serenades, cassations, notturni and divertimenti)
 1.4 Incidental music (1)
 1.5 Ballets (3)
 1.6 Dances (15 collections of Menuetti, 3 of Menuettini, 1 English Dances, 1 German Dances)
 1.7 Marches (15 marches and fragments of marches)
 1.8 Quintets (6)
 1.9 Quartets (19)
 1.10 Trio Sonatas (10)
 1.11 Duo Sonatas (4)
 1.12 Solo Sonatas (2)
 1.13 Keyboard (19 compositions)
 1.14 Unknown instrumentation (1)

Sacred vocal music
 2.1 Antiphons (47)
 2.2 Cantatas (5)
 2.3 Canticles (65)
 2.4 Graduals (130)
 2.5 Hymns (16)
 2.6 Masses (47) including Missa Sancti Francisci Seraphici and Missa tempore Quadragesimae
 2.7 Motets (7)
 2.8 Offertories (65)
 2.9 Oratorios (7)
 2.10 Psalm settings (19)
 2.11 Requiem (2, 1 completed only to the Kyrie, completed in 1839 by Paul Gunther Kronecker OSB (1803–1847) )
 2.12 Other (42)

Secular vocal music
 3.1 Arias (8)
 3.2 Canons (65)
 3.3 Cantatas (14)
 3.4 Part-songs (97)
 3.5 Operas (1)
 3.6 Serenatas (1)
 3.7 Singspiele (11)
 3.8 Songs (46)

Recordings
 Michael Haydn: Symphonies N.1-12,15,16,18,25-28 (1998, CPO) - Slovak Chamber Orchestra conducted by Bohdan Warchal
 Michael Haydn: Die Wahrheit der Natur (2018, CPO) - Salzburger Hofmusik o.l.v. Wolfgang Brunner
 Michael Haydn: Endimione (2021, CPO) - Salzburger Hofmusik conducted by Wolfgang Brunner
 Michael Haydn: Kaiser Constantin I (2022, Accent ACC26504) - Purcell Choir & Orfeo Orchestra conducted by György Vashegyi
 Michael Haydn: Missa Sancti Aloysii (2022, Brilliant Classics) - Genova Vocal Ensemble & Accademia Vocaledi Genova conducted by Roberta Paraninfo

Notes

Sources

Further reading

External links

 
 
 The Michael Haydn Project( ) – Biography, works, literature, etc. for Michael Haydn and his contemporaries
 Michael Haydn, Classical Archives
 "Jubilaeumsmesse" in MP3-Format (creative commons licence)

1737 births
1806 deaths
18th-century Austrian people
18th-century classical composers
18th-century male musicians
19th-century male musicians
Austrian classical musicians
Austrian Classical-period composers
Austrian expatriates in Hungary
Austrian people of Hungarian descent
Austrian Roman Catholics
Catholic liturgical composers
Composers for carillon
Composers from Salzburg
Joseph Haydn
People from Bruck an der Leitha District
String quartet composers